Dharmapuri usually refers to Dharmapuri, Tamil Nadu.

Dharmapuri may also refer to:

 Dharmapuri, Telangana, city in Telangana
 Dharmapuri, Telangana Assembly constituency
 Dharmapuri, Jagtial district, a village in Telangana
 Dharmapuri District, Tamil Nadu
 Dharmapuri taluk, Tamil Nadu
 Dharmapuri (Lok Sabha constituency)
 Dharmapuri, Tamil Nadu Assembly constituency
 Roman Catholic Diocese of Dharmapuri
 Dharmapuri (film), a 2006 Indian Tamil film
 Dharmapuri Arvind, a politician from Telangana
 Dharmapuri (Puducherry), a municipal ward in Puducherry district